Ngataki is a community on the Aupouri Peninsula in Northland, New Zealand. State Highway 1 runs through the area. To the east is Rarawa Beach, a mile-long strip of clean silver sand, gently shelving and backed by sand dunes. To the north-east is the Great Exhibition Bay and Rarawa Bay and to the south-west is the long Ninety Mile Beach coastline.

Marae
The local Waiora Marae and meeting house are a traditional meeting place for Ngāti Kurī.

Demographics
The SA1 area is part of the larger North Cape statistical area.

The SA1 statistical area had a population of 105 at the 2018 New Zealand census, an increase of 12 people (12.9%) since the 2013 census, and an increase of 30 people (40.0%) since the 2006 census. There were 51 households, comprising 51 males and 57 females, giving a sex ratio of 0.89 males per female. The median age was 44.8 years (compared with 37.4 years nationally), with 24 people (22.9%) aged under 15 years, 15 (14.3%) aged 15 to 29, 54 (51.4%) aged 30 to 64, and 15 (14.3%) aged 65 or older.

Ethnicities were 77.1% European/Pākehā, 40.0% Māori, 2.9% Pacific peoples, 2.9% Asian, and 2.9% other ethnicities. People may identify with more than one ethnicity.

Of those people who chose to answer the census's question about religious affiliation, 51.4% had no religion, 34.3% were Christian and 2.9% had other religions.

Of those at least 15 years old, 21 (25.9%) people had a bachelor or higher degree, and 12 (14.8%) people had no formal qualifications. The median income was $32,500, compared with $31,800 nationally. 15 people (18.5%) earned over $70,000 compared to 17.2% nationally. The employment status of those at least 15 was that 42 (51.9%) people were employed full-time, 15 (18.5%) were part-time, and 6 (7.4%) were unemployed.

Education
Ngataki School is a coeducational full primary (years 1–8) school with a roll of  students as of  The school was founded about 1911.

Attractions
Rarawa Beach is located near Ngataki, on the eastern Pacific coast.

In December 2008, school students planted one hundred and twenty rare coastal Holloway's Crystalwort – Atriplex hollowayi plants, small native herbs that grow near high tide level on sandy beaches. In 2009, Ngataki School and the New Zealand Department of Conservation worked together to help restore the beach, a home to dotterels and oystercatchers, because the ecosystem was under threat as a result of natural and man-made causes.

In September 2010, fourteen rescued pilot whales swam strongly out to sea at Rarawa Beach after being rescued from a mass whale stranding at Spirits Bay. The transportation of the whales to Rarawa Beach was considered to be the largest whale transport ever attempted.

In 2011, day four of the National Scholastic Surfing Championship was held at Rarawa Beach.

References

External links 
 Rarawa Beach in Auckland – New Zealand

Far North District
Populated places in the Northland Region